Thomas DeCoud (born March 19, 1985) is a former American football free safety. He played college football for the University of California, Berkeley. He was drafted by the Atlanta Falcons in the third round of the 2008 NFL Draft. DeCoud currently coaches football at California High School.

Early years
DeCoud attended Glencove Elementary School and Hogan Senior High School in Vallejo, California, then attended Pinole Valley High School in Pinole, California and was a letterman in football and basketball. In football, as a senior, he was an All-ACCAL selection. In basketball, he was an All-ACCAL selection. DeCoud graduated from Pinole High School in 2003.

Professional career

Atlanta Falcons
DeCoud was drafted by the Atlanta Falcons in the third round of the 2008 NFL Draft.

Playing primarily on special teams in 10 games as a rookie, DeCoud recorded 6 tackles (5 solo). He had a breakout season the next year as he started all 16 games at free safety and compiled 68 tackles (57 solo), 2 sacks, 2 forced fumbles, 7 pass deflections and 3 interceptions. After the season, DeCoud received recognition from USA Today, which listed him on its annual "All-Joe" team.

In a SportsCenter interview on September 27, 2012, Decoud played the "Meow Game" from the movie Super Troopers.

Decoud was released from the Falcons on March 11, 2014.

Carolina Panthers
The Carolina Panthers signed DeCoud to a two-year deal on April 10, 2014. DeCoud made his first start for the Panthers in a 20-14 victory against the Tampa Bay Buccaneers in week 1. During the home opener in a 24-7 win against the Detroit Lions in week 2, DeCoud recorded 3 tackles and was responsible for a pass deflection deep downfield against Calvin Johnson which led to an interception by Melvin White. During the Panthers week 5 victory over the Chicago Bears, DeCoud recorded his first interception for the Panthers against Jay Cutler to go along with 4 tackles and a pass deflection. He was released on February 17, 2015.

References

External links

California Golden Bears bio
Atlanta Falcons bio
Carolina Panthers bio

1985 births
Living people
Players of American football from Oakland, California
American football safeties
California Golden Bears football players
Atlanta Falcons players
Carolina Panthers players
People from Pinole, California
National Conference Pro Bowl players
Sportspeople from Vallejo, California